Andrew Dobbie Christie (1922 – May 28, 1993) was a justice of the Delaware Supreme Court from 1983 to 1992, and chief justice from 1985 to 1992.

Born in Cincinnati, Christie's father was a distinguished Presbyterian minister. Christie attended the local public schools, graduating from Mercersburg Academy in 1940. He matriculated at Princeton University, but left to serve in the United States Army Air Force for three years during World War II. He then returned to Princeton, graduating in February 1947, and then receiving an LL.B. from the University of Pennsylvania Law School in 1949, where he was a member of the Order of the Coif. Christie then served as a law clerk for the Hon. John Biggs, Jr. on the United States Court of Appeals for the Third Circuit.

In November 1952, Delaware Governor J. Caleb Boggs appointed Christie to be executive director of the State Legislative Reference Bureau. Boggs then appointed Christie to the Superior Court for New Castle County, in 1957. Christie held that position until March 1983, when Governor Pete du Pont appointed Christie to a seat on the Delaware Supreme Court vacated by the resignation of William T. Quillen. In 1985, Chief Justice Daniel L. Herrmann retired, and Governor Michael N. Castle elevated Christie to the office of Chief Justice, which "was widely applauded".

A year after retiring from the court, Christie was killed in a traffic accident in Arizona, near the New Mexico border, while visiting national monuments with his wife Carol.

References

Justices of the Delaware Supreme Court
1993 deaths
Road incident deaths in Arizona
Princeton University alumni
University of Pennsylvania Law School alumni
Law clerks
1922 births
20th-century American judges
United States Army Air Forces personnel of World War II